Kanholmsfjärden is a major bay in the Stockholm archipelago. In October 2014, it was the location where the Swedish Armed Forces conducted a search for an alleged damaged foreign submarine.

Stockholm archipelago
Bays of Sweden
Landforms of Stockholm County